Giuseppe Agellio (1570 – after 1620) was an Italian painter of the Baroque period. Born in Sorrento, he was a pupil of the painter Cristoforo Roncalli and worked in Rome. He excelled in painting landscape and architecture.

His works include decorations in the choir of the Theatine church of San Silvestro al Quirinale in Rome, for which the contract, dated 1602 and signed by Agellio and his collaborator Matteo Zaccolini, survives.

References

Sources

1570 births
17th-century deaths
People from Sorrento
16th-century Italian painters
Italian male painters
17th-century Italian painters
Painters from Naples
Italian Baroque painters
Painters of architecture